The white-backed swallow (Cheramoeca leucosterna) is a member of the family Hirundinidae and is endemic to Australia.  It is monotypic within the genus Cheramoeca. As with all swallows within the family Hirundinidae, it is characterised by adaptation to aerial feeding. The white-backed swallow can be identified by its white back, surrounded by black wings and tail. The white-backed swallow has a wide distribution, from the southern part of the Australian continent, up to the Tropic of Capricorn. The white-backed swallow prefers grasslands and will create a burrow nest.

Taxonomy
John Gould first described the white-backed swallow in 1841 and included it in his publication “The Birds of Australia”. The white-backed swallow is also sometimes referred to as “Black-and-white Swallow", "White-breasted Swallow", "White-capped Swallow.". A taxonomic synonym for Cheramoeca leucosterna is Cheramoeca leucosternus.

Description 

An adult white-backed swallow averages 15 cm long, similar in size to other swallows found within Australia. The adult has a mottled grey cap above white eyebrows and a grey eye. It has a dark stripe running from the lores and across the nape of the neck. The back and most of the breast is white. The belly, wings and tail are black.

The white-backed swallow has a deeply forked tail, with curved and pointed wings. The short bill is black; the legs and feet are grey. They have a slender, streamlined body. Their eyes consist of a prominent, dark iris. The sexes have similar colouring but during adolescence the white-backed swallow has duller colours.

Distribution and habitat 
White-backed swallows are endemic to Australia and have a wide population distribution on the continent. They can be found from the southern latitudes of Australia and their range extends to the Tropic of Capricorn. Occasionally, after inland rainfall, white-backed swallows can extend their range to encompass the entire southern portion of Australia including the desert regions. White-backed swallows prefer open country, above open grassland and low shrubs. During the breeding season, they have a strong preference for habitats around creek beds.

There is no population count, but the species is reported to be common. Due to range expansion from land clearance and mining, the population is estimated to be increasing. Due to the large range and increasing population, the white-backed swallow is categorised as least concern by the IUCN.

Behaviour 
White-backed swallows are insectivorous and feed in-flight on insects, like all known swallows. The composition of their diet varies by geographic region and with the time of year. They typically nest by digging a horizontal tunnel into a vertical dirt cliff. Predation of swallows nests is known to occur, typically from foxes and cats.

References 

[[File:The birds of Australia (17065696432).jpg|The birds of Australia (17065696432)]]

white-backed swallow
Endemic birds of Australia
white-backed swallow
Taxonomy articles created by Polbot